The Peugeot 405 is a large family car released by the French automaker Peugeot in July 1987, and which continues to be manufactured under licence outside France, having been discontinued in Europe in 1997. It was voted European Car of the Year for 1988 by the largest number of votes in the history of the contest. About 2.5 million vehicles have been sold worldwide, both in LHD and RHD, as a saloon and estate. Inearly 2020, the 33-year production run of the Peugeot 405 was counted as the twentieth most long-lived single generation car in history."

Its appearance is similar to the Alfa Romeo 164, launched the same year and also styled by Pininfarina. While the 405 shares its floorpan with the Citroën BX, it does not have that car's hydropneumatic suspension except 4x4 version on the rear axle (SRix4, Mi16x4 and T16) . As with the BX, the 405 used TU/XU petrol and XUD diesel engines. The 405 was the last Peugeot vehicle sold in the United States, on sale between 1988 and 1991, including the Mi16.

The 405 has been available in LHD, and RHD versions, as a saloon and estate, in front wheel, and four wheel drive. No coupé model was ever offered to the public, unlike the 504 and later 406: only two examples of the purpose-built 405 Turbo 16 (not to be confused with 405 T16) were made.

History
In July 1987, Peugeot unveiled ten versions of the 405 saloon simultaneously for the 1988 model year, with sales on the continent beginning in October 1987 and sales in the United Kingdom beginning in January 1988. It succeeded the long-running Peugeot 305, but also the Chrysler Alpine hatchback and Solara saloon which had been discontinued when the Talbot brand was axed a year earlier. The slightly smaller 305 was discontinued from the Peugeot range soon after the 405's launch, with production of the larger 505 ending a few years later. Peugeot's new range-topping model after 1989 was the larger 605.

Estate sales began in May 1988, although the British market did not receive estate versions until October 1988. No coupé was ever offered to the public, unlike the 504 and later 406. Right hand drive versions being produced at the former plant of Rootes/Chrysler at Ryton near Coventry, and left hand drive production taking place at Sochaux in France.

In 1988, naturally aspirated (1.9) and turbocharged (1.8) diesel engines were added to the range. The 500,000th 405 was produced during 1989, followed by the one millionth 405 to leave the Sochaux factory in 1990. This was also when the BE1 transmission was replaced by the BE3.

In 1991, there were updates to the dashboard, steering wheel, and soundproofing, but for 1992, the Phase II model arrived with a new boot with better ingress, new rear lights and boot design, and a new dashboard. 405 production had reached over 1,500,000 by this time. 

In the autumn of 1995, the 405's replacement, the 406 was introduced and the 405 saloon was discontinued. An airbag had been available on the 405 since 1994, and standard on the left hand drive Mi16 and T16. At the beginning of 1997, the estate version of the 406 was launched, marking the end of European 405 production after ten years. 

The 405 was one of Europe's best selling larger family cars, particularly in France and Britain. It was the eighth best selling car in Britain in 1992 and 1993. The 405 also became a popular model in Thailand, following the success of the Peugeot 505 after the Government of Thailand cancelled a restriction on CBU car imports in the late 1980s.

Manufacturing
Designed in France, the Peugeot 405 has been manufactured in:

 Europe: from 1987 to 1997 at Sochaux (France) and Ryton (United Kingdom).
 Zimbabwe: until 2002, by Quest.
 Egypt: Wagih Abaza produced the 405.
 Iran: produced by Iran Khodro from1990 to 2020
 Chile: Produced by Franco-Chilena in Los Andes, including STI Phase II model.
 Argentina: Several saloon models, including diesels, were built in the Villa Bosch Peugeot facility from 1992 to 1999. In this country, the 405 has been an extremely popular car with total sales of over 500,000 units.
 Poland: Around 4000 were assembled in FSC Lublin between 1992 and 1995.
 Taiwan: Produced by Yu-Tien Motors from 1989 until 1995 (Production ceased after bankruptcy).
 Thailand: Produced by Ymc Assembly Co., Ltd. from 1989 until 1997
 Azerbaijan: Produced by Khazar Iran Khodro at the Neftchala Industrial District since 2019.

Versions
The 405 range included three petrol engines and two diesel engines, all four cylinders, in a variety of states of tune and specification. The range was tailored to suit different export markets. The 1.4 litre (1,360 cc) engine was fitted with a four-speed manual gearbox. It produces  at 5,600 rpm. 

The 1.6 litre (1,580 cc) engine was fitted with a five speed manual gearbox and produced  at 6,000 rpm. The 1.9 litre (1,905 cc) engine was available with a five speed manual gearbox, with an option of an automatic in the lower powered version.

In 1992, the range was facelifted. While the changes were deep, including a modified bottom plate and chassis structure, the design was almost indistinguishable from the pre-facelift model. 

The windscreens were now bonded; all of these changes increased torsional rigidity considerably while still allowing a deeper opening for the bootlid of the sedan. The taillights were also redesigned and the trim piece between them removed, all in the image of the bigger 605. The interior was also redone, with an all new dashboard and door trim, inheriting many detail parts as well as the overall appearance from the 605.

In April 1993, the T16 was introduced to celebrate the successes of the competition model, with a 2.0 litre 16 valve turbocharged XU10J4TE engine with water cooled chargecooler, constant four wheel drive with 53/47% power distribution and self regulating hydraulic rear axle. It was never built in a right hand drive model. 

The diesel engine options included a 1.9 litre (1,905 cc) unit producing  at 4,600 rpm or a turbocharged 1.8 litre (1,769 cc) unit producing .

Britain
At launch in January 1988, the 405 was available with a choice 1.6, and 1.9 carbureted engines, and an injected 1.9. Both diesel and petrol engines were available at launch.
 Late 1988: debut of the performance model, the Mi 16. Addition of the estate and a 1.8 litre turbo diesel. 
 Late 1989: four wheel drive Mi16x4, GRiX4 were added.
 1990: Update to dashboard.
 1992: Updates to interior, 1.9s petrol engine replaced by a catalysed 2.0.
 1994: power steering and remote central locking become standard on all models. Driver's airbag added.
 1995: Executive and Quasar models added.
 1996: 405 saloon replaced by the 406. Estate revised and sold until replaced by the 406 estate in 1997.
Other engines included 1.4, 1.6, and 1.8. Other styles included the GE, GL, GLx4, GLD, GLDT, GR, GTXi, GTXDT, Le Mans, LX, Mi, Style D, Style DT, Quasar, SRi, SRDT, STi, and STDT.

North America

The DL and S were also available in estate form, called Sportswagon. Peugeot withdrew from the markets in the United States and Canada after the model year of 1991.

Iran

Iran Khodro also produces several models derived from the 405. The Peugeot Pars, also known as the Peugeot Persia, is a facelifted 405 with a redesigned front end including clear lamp lenses and a revised rear. The Peugeot RD is a rear wheel drive car which has a 405 body and mechanical parts from the Paykan. Since 2006, it has been sold in certain markets in the Middle East as the Peugeot ROA. 

The Samand, which was designed to be a "national car" for Iran, is also based on the 405 platform. It replaced the long running Paykan which was itself based on the Hillman Hunter, an ancestor (in corporate ownership and model positioning terms) of the 405, having been produced by the Rootes Group and Chrysler UK from 1963 until 1979, the year that Peugeot purchased Chrysler's European operations.

Iran Khodro, the leading Iranian car manufacture produces the following models of Peugeot 405:
 Peugeot 405 GL/GLX with 1.6L & 1.9L 8 valve Carburetor engine, this model was taken out of production in 2002.
 Peugeot 405 GLX with 1.8L 8 valve fuel injection engine and modified options, the gasoline model production stopped in 2020 but the CNG version remains in production (as does the SLX).
 Peugeot 405 SLX with 1.6L 16 valve PSA TU5 engine, redesigned dashboard with two airbags, ABS brakes.
 Peugeot Pars: A modern facelift of the 405 in four models with 1.8L 8 valve, 1.9L 8 valve, 1.6L 16 valve (PSA TU5 engine) and 1.8L 16 valve engines.
 Peugeot RD and ROA: Cheaper models that use the eight-valve Hillman Avenger(Paykan) engine in the 405 body. The RD uses the original 1.6-litre version, this was upgraded to a 1.7-litre unit in the ROA. Production of these models was stopped in 2011.
 IKCO Samand, Soren, Dena And Dena Plus: Iran's National Cars which are developments using the 405 platform
 IKCO Arisun: badged under Iran Khodro's own brand, but still heavily based on the 405. It is a coupe utility which has been in production since 2015.

Motorsport

The motorsport version of the 405, the rallying 405 Turbo 16 GR, was very different from the road going 405. It was built in a coupé body style in mid-engine configuration, had constant four wheel drive with electronically adjustable center differential like the 205 T16, as it was based on the same technology. At least four were produced, competing in hill climbs and the Paris-Dakar rally. 

Today, three are in the official Peugeot museum, and the other is in a private collection.

1988: Finnish driver Ari Vatanen set a new record in the Pikes Peak International Hillclimb (an award-winning film of the drive titled Climb Dance was made by Jean Louis Mourey). Kankkunen and Piironen win the Paris-Dakar Rally in the 405 T16 GR.
1989: Victory in the Paris-Dakar rally by the Vatanen-Ickx team in a 405 T16 GR.
1990: Victory in the Paris-Dakar rally by the Vatanen-Berglund team in a 405 T16 GR.

Racing 405s much closer in specification to the road going models were campaigned for several years in European touring car racing during the early to mid 1990s, most notably in the British Touring Car Championship and the French Supertourisme Championship. In Britain, the 405 did not achieve much success, but the car won the French series in both 1994 and 1995, in the hands of Laurent Aïello.

Gallery

Sales and production

Notes

External links

Climb Dance short film at Google Video
Climb Dance short film in higher quality, 61MB MPEG file
A British TV ad featuring the song Take My Breath Away

405
Mid-size cars
Sedans
Station wagons
Front-wheel-drive vehicles
All-wheel-drive vehicles
1990s cars
Cars introduced in 1987
Cars of Argentina
Touring cars
Dakar Rally winning cars
Cars of Iran
Police vehicles